Robert Walter Quarry (November 3, 1925 – February 20, 2009) was an American actor, known for several prominent horror film roles.

Life and career
Quarry was born in Santa Rosa, California, the son of Mable (née Shoemaker) and Paul Quarry, a doctor. His grandmother was an actress. He left school at the age of 14 to pursue a career in radio.

During World War II in November 1943, Quarry joined the United States Army, where he formed a theatrical troupe. After the war he acted again, first for RKO and then for MGM.

His films include Count Yorga, Vampire (1970), its sequel The Return of Count Yorga (1971), and Dr. Phibes Rises Again (1972), in which he played alchemist Dr. Biederbeck pitted against Vincent Price's Phibes in a race to find the mythical elixir of eternal life. Price reportedly did not care for his co-star — once, when Quarry was singing in his dressing room during the making of Dr Phibes Rises Again, he said to Price, "You didn't know I could sing did you?" and Price replied: "Well I knew you couldn't act." However, Quarry related later that while it was difficult to act opposite Price (who was acting with expressions rather than his voice, provided offscreen), he stated that he dodged blowing many takes by simply relating to a person he hated and look at his ear (which earned him the praise of doing the scenes better than Price's previous co-star Joseph Cotten); a publicity event had resulted in Price hearing about the plan to replace him because of a question posed to him, and while a rift did occur between the two actors, it did not affect the production of the film, which was also noted by producer Louis M. Heyward. The duo would later be paired in Madhouse (1974), the last film to feature Price at AIP. 

American International Pictures had plans for Quarry to succeed Price, signing him to a long-term contract, but a variety of factors affected his career at the studio: the departure of AIP co-founder James H. Nicholson and business manager Paul Zimmerman, the decline in the company's fortunes that forced cheaper productions, and the subsequent degradation of popularity in old-style horror films.  Quarry did make further horror film appearances, as the hippy guru vampire Khorda in 1973's The Deathmaster, and as a gangster in the 1974 zombie movie Sugar Hill.

Quarry made several guest appearances on TV shows, including two in 1965 on Perry Mason. He appeared on an episode of The Rockford Files. He played disfigured gunrunner Commander Corliss in the Buck Rogers in the 25th Century episode "Return of the Fighting 69th". He played in two episodes of The Lone Ranger. 

In 1980 he was in an automobile accident, in which he was struck by a drunk driver. It resulted in serious facial injuries. He was also mugged in Hollywood shortly thereafter. In 1987, Quarry returned to film with Cyclone directed by Fred Olen Ray. Quarry would be cast in over 20 of Ray's films in the remainder of his career.

Death
Quarry died on February 20, 2009, at the Motion Picture & Television Country House and Hospital in Woodland Hills, California, aged 83.

Filmography

Shadow of a Doubt (1943) – Santa Rosa Teenager (uncredited)
Soldier of Fortune (1955) – Frank Stewart – U.S. Consulate (uncredited)
House of Bamboo (1955) – Phil (uncredited)
A Kiss Before Dying (1956) – Dwight Powell
Crime of Passion (1957) – Reporter
Official Detective (1957, TV Series) – Ed Platt
Sea Hunt (1959, TV Series) – Bill Hill
Agent for H.A.R.M. (1966) – Borg
Winning (1969) – Sam Jagin (uncredited)
Colossus: The Forbin Project (1970) – Scientist (uncredited)
Count Yorga, Vampire (1970) – Count Yorga
WUSA (1970) – Noonan
The Return of Count Yorga (1971) – Count Yorga
Dr. Phibes Rises Again (1972) – Darrus Biederbeck
The Deathmaster (1973) – Khorda
Sugar Hill (1974) – Morgan
The Midnight Man (1974) – Dr. Prichette
Madhouse (1974) – Oliver Quayle
Rollercoaster (1977) – Mayor
Cyclone (1987) – Knowles
Commando Squad (1987) – Milo
Moon in Scorpio (1987) – Dr. Khorda
Warlords (1988) – Dr. Mathers
L.A. Bounty (1989) – Jimmy
Beverly Hills Vamp (1989) – Father Ferraro
Sexbomb (1989) – King Faraday
Alienator (1990) – Doc Burnside
Haunting Fear (1990) – 	Visconti
Mob Boss (1990) – Dr. Jones 
Spirits (1990) – Dr. Richard Wicks
Evil Spirits (1990) – Doctor
Teenage Exorcist (1991) – Father McFerrin
Evil Toons (1992) – Demon (voice, uncredited)
Angel Eyes (1993) – Murray
Mind Twister (1993) – Bob
Inner Sanctum II (1994) – Steve Warren
Droid Gunner (1995) – Chew'Bah
The Shooter (1997) – Examiner
Jungle Boy (1998) – Bono (voice)
Dear Santa (1998) – Mr. Ambrose
Mom's Outta Sight (1998) – Robert Secord
The Prophet (1999) – Agent Betts

References

External links
 
 
 

1925 births
2009 deaths
American male film actors
American male television actors
Male actors from Santa Rosa, California
20th-century American male actors